Volleyball at the 1976 Summer Paralympics consisted of a men's team event. Sitting volleyball was also included as a demonstration event.

Medal summary

Medal table

References 

 

1976 Summer Paralympics events
1976
Paralympics